René-François Walter de Sluse (also Renatius Franciscus Slusius or Walther de Sluze; 2 July 1622 – 19 March 1685) was a Walloon mathematician and churchman, who served as the canon of Liège and abbot of Amay.

Biography
He was born in Visé, Spanish Netherlands (in present-day Belgium) and studied at the University of Leuven (1638–1642) before receiving a master's degree in law from the University of Rome, La Sapienza in 1643. There he also studied several languages, mathematics and astronomy. Aside from mathematics he also produced works on astronomy, physics, natural history, general history and theological subjects related to his work in the Church.

He became a canon of the Catholic church in 1650, soon after which he became canon of Liège. In 1666 he took a new position as abbot of Amay. His position in the church prevented him from visiting other mathematicians, but he corresponded with the mathematicians and intellectuals of the day; his correspondents included Blaise Pascal, Christiaan Huygens, John Wallis, and Michelangelo Ricci. He was appointed Chancellor of Liège and Counsellor and Chancellor to Prince Maximilian-Henry of Bavaria.

He was elected a Fellow of the Royal Society in 1674.

He died in Liège, Spanish Netherlands.

Mathematical contributions
Sluse contributed to the development of calculus and this work focuses upon spirals, tangents, turning points and points of inflection. He and Johannes Hudde found algebraic algorithms for finding tangents, minima and maxima that were later utilized by Isaac Newton. These algorithms greatly improved upon the complicated algebraic methods of Pierre de Fermat and René Descartes, who themselves had improved upon Roberval's kinematic, but geometric, non-algorithmic methods of determining tangents.

Augustus De Morgan has the following to say about de Sluse's contribution to Newton's method of fluxions in his discussion of the Leibniz–Newton calculus controversy.

When they state that Collins had been four years in circulating the letter in which the method of fluxions was sufficiently described to any intelligent person, they suppress two facts: first, that the letter itself was in consequence of Newton's learning that Sluse had a method of tangents; secondly, that it revealed no more than Sluse had done. ...this method of Sluse is never allowed to appear ...Sluse wrote an account of the method which he had previously signified to Collins, for the Royal Society, for whom it was printed. The rule is precisely that of Newton... To have given this would have shown the world that the grand communication which was asserted to have been sent to Leibniz in June 1676 might have been seen in print, and learned from Sluse, at any time in the previous years: accordingly it was buried under reference. ...Leibniz had seen Hudde at Amsterdam, and had found that Hudde was in possession of even more than Sluse.

He found for the subtangent of a curve

f(x, y) = 0

an expression equivalent to

He also wrote numerous tracts, and in particular discussed at some length spirals and points of inflexion. The Conchoid of de Sluze is named after him. He is described by John Wallis in his Algebra as "a very accurate and ingenious person." Several of his works were included in the Transactions of the Royal Society, e.g. his method of drawing tangents to geometrical curves.

See also
List of Roman Catholic scientist-clerics

References

1622 births
1685 deaths
People from Visé
Mathematicians of the Spanish Netherlands
Catholic clergy scientists
Fellows of the Royal Society